Lawrence Crown (25 February 1898–1984) was an English footballer who played in the Football League for Bury, Coventry City, Newcastle United and South Shields.

References

1898 births
1984 deaths
English footballers
Association football defenders
English Football League players
Sunderland A.F.C. players
Darlington F.C. players
Gateshead A.F.C. players
Newcastle United F.C. players
Bury F.C. players
Coventry City F.C. players